HSwMS Orust (M41) was a Swedish minesweeper used to train new recruits. It was originally a trawler.

References

Minesweepers
Naval ships of Sweden